Brandon Bantz (born January 7, 1987) is an American former professional baseball catcher who played in Major League Baseball (MLB) for the Seattle Mariners.

A native of Arlington, Texas, Bantz attended Mansfield High School where he was teammates with Jordan Walden. He played college baseball at Dallas Baptist University. In 2008, he played collegiate summer baseball with the Bourne Braves of the Cape Cod Baseball League. He was selected by the Mariners in the 30th round of the 2009 MLB Draft.

Bantz was called up to the majors for the first time on June 5, 2013. Bantz appeared in one game for the Mariners, starting at catcher in his only appearance. At the plate, he faced Andy Pettitte twice, grounding out once and striking out once before Endy Chávez replaced him as a pinch hitter in the eighth inning. Behind the plate, he caught Joe Saunders, Danny Farquhar and Óliver Pérez. He allowed stolen bases to Robinson Canó and Jayson Nix.

Bantz was released by the Mariners on March 27, 2014 and signed as a minor league free agent with the Washington Nationals on April 1, 2014.  Washington released Bantz on May 23, 2014 and he was with the  Miami Marlins organization in 2015.

References

External links

1987 births
Living people
Seattle Mariners players
Baseball players from Texas
Dallas Baptist Patriots baseball players
Major League Baseball catchers
People from Mansfield, Texas
Pulaski Mariners players
Everett AquaSox players
Clinton LumberKings players
West Tennessee Diamond Jaxx players
Jackson Generals (Southern League) players
Tacoma Rainiers players
High Desert Mavericks players
Adelaide Bite players
Harrisburg Senators players
Long Island Ducks players
Jacksonville Suns players
New Orleans Zephyrs players
Bourne Braves players
American expatriate baseball players in Australia
Waterloo Bucks players